Foreign Service may refer to:
Diplomatic service, the body of diplomats and foreign policy officers maintained by the government of a country
United States Foreign Service, the diplomatic service of the United States government
Foreign Service Officer
Foreign Service Institute
Foreign Service Journal
Foreign Service brat, term for children born or raised abroad to Foreign Service Officers
Indian Foreign Service, the diplomatic service of India
Foreign Service Institute of India now the Sushma Swaraj Institute of Foreign Service, under the Ministry of External Affairs in New Delhi, India
Foreign Service of Pakistan, the diplomatic service of Pakistan
Foreign Service Academy
Her Majesty's Diplomatic Service, the diplomatic service of the United Kingdom, and specifically the organisation which ran the Foreign Office in London before amalgamation with the Diplomatic Service in 1918